Henry Harrison Hathorn (November 28, 1813 – February 20, 1887) was a businessman and Republican U.S. Representative from New York.

Personal
Born in Greenfield, New York, Hathorn attended the common schools and was graduated from the public schools of Greenfield.

He died at Saratoga Springs, New York on February 20, 1887, and was interred in Greenridge Cemetery.

Business career
Hathorn engaged in mercantile pursuits in Saratoga Springs from 1839 to 1849.
He discovered and plumbed the "Hathorn Mineral Spring" and was the proprietor of Union Hotel in Saratoga Springs. In 1854 he purchased "Congress Hall" and expanded it, adding another story and a ballroom.

Political career
Hathorn served as Sheriff of Saratoga County from 1853 to 1856 and 1862 to 1865.
He was Town Supervisor of Saratoga Springs in 1858, 1860, 1866, and 1867.
Hathorn was elected as a Republican to the Forty-third and Forty-fourth Congresses (March 4, 1873 – March 3, 1877).

References

General

1813 births
1887 deaths
People from Greenfield, New York
Burials at Greenridge Cemetery
Republican Party members of the United States House of Representatives from New York (state)
Politicians from Saratoga Springs, New York
19th-century American politicians